Zai may refer to:
 Democratic Republic of the Congo, formerly Zaire, ongoing UNDP code ZAI
 Zaï, an off season farming technique to collect water and nutrients from compost, to restore degraded drylands and increase soil fertility
 Zai (surname) (宰), a Chinese surname
 Zai (tribe), Pashtun tribes
 Zai, Palghar, a village in Maharashtra, India
 Zväz autorov a interprétov populárnej hudby (Union of Authors and Performers, ZAI), a presenter of the ZAI Awards
 Zaire, a former state in Africa
 Zayin, a letter of many Semitic abjads
 Isthmus Zapotec (ISO 639-3: zai), a Zapotecan language of Mexico

Given names 
 Li Zai (died 1343), Chinese painter
 Wang Zai, Chinese general of the Tang Dynasty
 Yuan Zai (died 777), Chinese noble, Chancellor of the Tang Dynasty
 Zhang Zai (1020–1077), Chinese philosopher and cosmologist
 Zai Bennett, Television executive
 Zai Fundo (1899–1944), Albanian journalist and writer

See also 
 Zay (disambiguation)
 Zae (disambiguation)